Jimmy Bowskill (born 16 September 1990) is a Canadian blues singer, guitarist and bassist based in Toronto, Ontario.

Early life
Bowskill grew up in Bailieboro, a small village near Peterborough, Ontario, where he learned to play guitar.

Career
Bowskill began performing at a young age, and first played on stage at the age of eleven at Jeff Healey's club in Toronto, Ontario.  "They wouldn’t let an 11-year-old inside his club, so I started busking on the side- walk outside," Jimmy recalls in Guitar Player Magazine "Jeff heard about me, invited me in to play, and I did pretty well. I got a lot of gigs and exposure just from that one night."  Healey's bassist, Alec Fraser, provided studio time for Bowskill, and eventually he signed a deal with Ruf Records. The next year he recorded his first album, Old Soul, and performed on the main stage at the Peterborough Folk Festival.

Bowskill's second album, Soap Bars and Dog Ears, was nominated for a Juno Award when he was fourteen years of age.

In 2005 he was presented with a Maple Blues Award as "Best New Artist of the Year".

In 2010, he toured in Europe with Joe Bonamassa and Jeff Beck. He also performed more locally at the Belleville Blues Festival.

In 2011, he released his first live album, Jimmy Bowskill Band Live, produced by Ruf Records.

In 2012, Bowskill introduced his album Back Number at the Kincardine Lighthouse Blues Festival. The album was recorded at Metalworks Studios in Mississauga, Ontario. He also performed at the Windsor International BluesFest and at the All-Canadian Jazz Festival in Port Hope with the Ganaraska Sheiks.

While on tour in 2009, the Jimmy Bowskill Band included Wayne Deadder on bass and Dan Neill on drums.  In 2012, the band members were Ian McKeown on bass and Dan Reiff on drums.

In November 2015, Bowskill joined the Canadian rock band The Sheepdogs playing lead, rhythm and pedal steel guitar.

In 2016, Blue Rodeo released their album 1000 Arms, which includes Bowskill playing on two tracks.

By the time Blue Rodeo released their next album Many a Mile, Bowskill had become a full member of the band.

On September 1, 2022, The Sheepdogs announced that Jimmy had taken a hiatus from the band.

On January 12, 2023, Bowskill released Too Many Roads with Brittany Brooks.

Discography

Solo Albums 
Old Soul  (2003)
Jimmy Bowskill (2007)
Jimmy Bowskill Band Live (2009)
Back Number (2012).

With the Jimmy Bowskill Band 

 Soap Bars & Dog Ears (2004)

With Carlos del Junco 

 Blues Etc... (2016)

With The Sheepdogs 

 Changing Colours (2018)
 No Simple Thing (2021)
 Live At Lee's (2022)
 Outta Sight (2022)

With Blue Rodeo 

 Many a Mile (2021)

As Brooks And Bowskill (With Brittany Brooks) 

 Too Many Roads (2023)

References

1990 births
Living people
Canadian blues singers
Canadian blues guitarists
Musicians from Ontario